The Bedford Center Historic District encompasses the historic heart of the town of Bedford, Massachusetts.  It extends along Great Road between Bacon and Concord Roads, and includes primarily residential areas on adjacent side streets.  The area includes the town's main civic buildings, its first cemetery, and a diverse array of residential architecture spanning more than two centuries.  The district was listed on the National Register of Historic Places in 1977; its boundaries were adjusted in 2014 and its period of significance extended.

Description and history
The area that is now Bedford was settled in the 17th century, and was first incorporated as part of Billerica in 1655 before being separately incorporated in 1729, including a portion of neighboring Concord.  The town's civic center was at the time of incorporation established near its geographic center, with a colonial meeting house built in 1730 on land donated by early settler Israel Putnam.  Its network of major roads developed in part out of early roads connecting Concord and Billerica, with Great Road laid out sometime between 1713 and 1731.  The town's first cemetery was established just to its north in 1729, and was the town's only cemetery until 1849.

The oldest building in the district is the Fitch Tavern, built 1710. Most of the buildings in the district were built in the 18th and 19th centuries; there are some modern intrusions, but they are generally stylistically compatible. The centerpiece of the district is Bedford's First Parish Church, a Federal-style church built in 1816, which faces the town common. Also facing the common is Bedford's town hall, which was built in 1857 as a school, and has seen a variety of civic uses before housing town offices.

See also
National Register of Historic Places listings in Middlesex County, Massachusetts

References

Historic districts in Middlesex County, Massachusetts
Buildings and structures in Bedford, Massachusetts
National Register of Historic Places in Middlesex County, Massachusetts
Historic districts on the National Register of Historic Places in Massachusetts